Ribbon Around the Bomb is the fourth studio album by English indie pop band Blossoms. It was released on 29 April 2022  by Virgin EMI Records.

Critical reception
Ribbon Around the Bomb received positive reviews upon its release. Stephen Ackroyd of Dork praised Blossoms as a "band that don't just connect in the here and now, but who are now making records to last for the long haul." Clash commented that the album was "endearing, prodigiously rich and ambitious" and "might well be their finest body of work to date." Louder Than War described the album as: "Classic, unfussy songwriting, instant hooks abound as the Stockport five-piece produce their most consistent record to date." The Evening Standard gave the album 4/5, praising it by writing: "From ABBA-ish jaunts to NYC odes, the five-piece are sounding rather more worldly". It added: "They're growing up, but haven't lost sight of what makes them so appealing".

NME rated the album 4/5, saying "it's a coming-of-age moment for the band, and there's no question Blossoms have levelled up with this release, sealing their status as giants of the game with more earnest and open songwriting." Gigwise rated the album 8/10, saying: "'Ribbon Around The Bomb' is a grand coming-of-age record. Featuring tight rhythms, compelling pop melodies and thoughtful lyrics, Blossoms signature chiming electric sound has developed in this mature record that puts song-writing at the forefront and solidifies their position as UK indie-pop icons."

Giving the album 8/10, Rolling Stone UK said: "The group have delivered arguably their most introspective effort yet. It dials down on the synths that featured so abundantly before and instead offers a sound that wears a love of classic songwriters proudly on its sleeve." The Times gave the album 4/5, saying: "They have found the music to match the image, taking inspiration from Paul Simon and Harry Nilsson to capture smooth songwriting charm."

Track listing

Personnel
Blossoms
 Tom Ogden – vocals, acoustic guitar (tracks 2–11); harmonica (2), piano (3, 4, 9, 12), electric guitar (5, 7, 9)
 Josh Dewhurst – acoustic guitar, electric guitar (2–5, 7–11)
 Charlie Salt – bass, background vocals (2–5, 7–11); clavinet (8), acoustic guitar (3,4)
 Joe Donovan – drums (2–5, 7–11)
 Myles Kellock – keyboards (2–5, 7–11)

Additional musicians
 Rosie Danvers – orchestration, cello (1–3, 8, 10, 11)
 Emma Owens – viola (1–3, 8, 10, 11)
 Meghan Cassidy – viola (1–3, 8, 10, 11)
 Ellie Stanford – violin (1–3, 8, 10, 11)
 Hayley Pomfrett – violin (1–3, 8, 10, 11)
 Jenny Sacha – violin (1–3, 8, 10, 11)
 Patrick Kiernan – violin (1–3, 8, 10, 11)
 Zara Benyounes – violin (1–3, 8, 10, 11)
 Fiona Skelly – background vocals (2–5, 7–11)
 Niamh Rowe – background vocals (2–5, 7–11)
 Ian Skelly – percussion (2–5, 7–11)

Technical
 James Skelly – production
 Rich Turvey – production, engineering
 Greg Calbi – mastering
 Craig Silvey – mixing
 Nick Taylor – engineering (1–3, 8, 10, 11)
 TommyD – production assistance (1–3, 8, 10, 11)
 Dani Bennett Spragg – mixing assistance
 Chris Taylor – engineering assistance
 Matthew Watson – engineering assistance
 Nathan Conboy – engineering assistance
 Toby Renwick – engineering assistance
 Will Bennett – engineering assistance

Charts

References

2022 albums
Blossoms (band) albums
Virgin EMI Records albums